Masoumeh is a feminine given name with Perso-Arabic origins. The name is a Persian spelling of the Arabic word Masuma, which translates to "innocent". English spelling variations include Ma'sumeh, Ma'soumeh, and Massumeh. Notable people with the name include:

 Hazrat Masoumeh (c. 790 AD–816 AD), also known as Fatimah bint Musa, daughter of the seventh Twelver Shia Imam, Musa al-Kazim

People with the given name Masoumeh 
 Masoumeh Abad (born 1962), Iranian author, university professor, and conservative politician
 Masoumeh Aghapour Alishahi (born 1969), Iranian lecturer and politician
 Masoumeh Pashaei Bahram (born 1980), Iranian physician and politician
 Masoumeh Azizi Borujerdi (1920–1961), commonly known as Mahvash, Iranian singer, dancer, and actress
 Masoumeh Dadehbala (1942–1990), commonly known as Hayedeh, Iranian singer
 Masoumeh Ebtekar (born 1960), Iranian, former Vice President of Iran for Women and Family Affairs
 Masoumeh Ramhormozi, Iranian author of the book, Eternal Fragrance (2003)

People with the given name Massoumeh 
 Massoumeh Seyhoun (1934–2010), Iranian painter and founder of Seyhoun Gallery

People with the given name Massumeh 
 Massumeh Farhad (born c. 1955), American art historian and curator

Other uses 
 Shrine of Hadhrat Masoumeh, a Shia Islam shrine in Qom

Iranian feminine given names